The University of Tennessee is a public research university in Knoxville, Tennessee, US.t

University of Tennessee may also refer to:

University of Tennessee at Chattanooga
University of Tennessee at Martin
University of Tennessee Southern
University of Tennessee Health Science Center
University of Tennessee Space Institute

See also
List of colleges and universities in Tennessee